Paul Marius Raymond Espeit (9 June 1878 – 23 May 1960) was a French cyclist. He competed in the men's sprint event at the 1900 Summer Olympics.

References

External links
 

1878 births
1960 deaths
French male cyclists
Olympic cyclists of France
Cyclists at the 1900 Summer Olympics
Sportspeople from Ardèche
Cyclists from Auvergne-Rhône-Alpes